The Young and Defenceless is an EP by Welsh post-hardcore band Funeral for a Friend, released on September 6, 2010. The title of the EP is sourced from a lyric in the track "Sixteen". This is the first release by Funeral for a Friend that includes bassist Richard Boucher and is also the first release to feature former bassist Gavin Burrough on guitars. The CD is limited edition, available only to those who bought it at PledgeMusic. In several European countries (not the UK), it is available for download from 7digital. On this release, the cover has been slightly changed. On October 29, 2010, the band released a music video for the song "Serpents in Solitude".

Two songs from the EP: "Sixteen" and "Damned If You Do, Dead If You Don't" were also later featured in the band's fifth full-length studio album Welcome Home Armageddon in 2011. "Sixteen," shall be the second single for their fifth studio album.

The artwork is illustrated by Rianne Rowlands

Track listing

Personnel
Matthew Davies-Kreye – lead vocals
Kris Coombs-Roberts – guitar
Gavin Burrough – guitar, backing vocals
Richard Boucher – bass guitar
Ryan Richards – drums, aggressive vocals
Romesh Dodangoda - producer
Jamie Telford, Danny Bugler & Rhodri Jones - Gang vocals on "Damned If You Do, Dead If You Don't"

References

External links
Pledgemusic.com
De.7digital.com

Funeral for a Friend albums
2010 EPs
Albums produced by Romesh Dodangoda